Tangiers Group is a group of companies owned by entrepreneur and philanthropist Christopher Catrambone, the founder of Migrant Offshore Aid Station (MOAS).

The Malta-based Tangiers Group was set up in 2006 and offers emergency, medical, on-the-ground information, insurance, and claims-handling services to a global customer base, often in changing and complex risk-management scenarios. Tangiers operates in 52 countries with more than 100 employees.

Tangiers Group is made up of Tangiers International, which offers claims handling, medical case management and emergency services and the Organisation for Better Security (OBS), which provides current intelligence and information about country conditions worldwide.

The company is now based in Malta's capital city Valletta.

According to Bloomberg Businessweek, Tangiers had $10 million in revenues in 2014.

References

2006 establishments in Malta
Financial services companies established in 2006
Companies based in Valletta
Multinational companies headquartered in Malta
Financial services companies of Malta